Saint-Seurin may refer to:

Places
Saint-Seurin-de-Palenne, Charente-Maritime
Saint-Seurin-de-Bourg, Gironde
Saint-Seurin-de-Cadourne, Gironde
Saint-Seurin-de-Prats, Dordogne
Saint-Seurin-sur-l'Isle, Gironde
Saint-Seurin-de-Cursac, Gironde

Churches
 Basilique Saint-Seurin de Bordeaux, Bordeaux
 Église Saint-Seurin, Gabarnac
 Église Saint-Seurin, Galgon
 Église Saint-Seurin, Lamarque
 Église Saint-Seurin, Rions
 Église Saint-Seurin, Saillans

See also
Severinus of Bordeaux
Chenac-Saint-Seurin-d'Uzet
Football Club Libourne